R. Athiswami was an Indian politician and former Member of the Legislative Assembly. He was elected to the Tamil Nadu legislative assembly as a Janata Party candidate from Colachel constituency in Kanyakumari district in 1977 election.

References 

Members of the Tamil Nadu Legislative Assembly
Year of birth missing
Janata Party politicians